John Garba Danbinta  is an Anglican bishop in Nigeria: he is the Bishop of Gusau, one of ten dioceses within the Anglican Province of Kaduna, itself one of 14 provinces within the Church of Nigeria.

He was elected Bishop of Gusau in 2005.

Notes

Living people
Anglican bishops of Gusau
21st-century Anglican bishops in Nigeria
20th-century Anglican bishops in Nigeria
Year of birth missing (living people)